Prince Hans of the Southern Isles is a fictional character from Walt Disney Animation Studios' animated film Frozen. He is voiced by Santino Fontana in the film.

Hans is the thirteenth prince of the Southern Isles. Knowing that he will be unable to inherit the throne of his own country, he concocts a scheme to usurp the throne of another country through marriage. Although he is portrayed as honest and noble throughout most of the film, he is later revealed to be deceptive, calculating, and cruel in nature.

Hans' villainy is a plot twist in Frozen, revealed in the film's final act. Despite the acclaim that the film has received, Hans' betrayal has been the subject of mixed reception from some critics. While the character's mastery of trickery and Fontana's performance have been praised, Hans' villainous reveal has been criticized for being too upsetting and confusing for the film's younger viewers. However, others have considered the character's shift in personality to be a valuable lesson that children can learn from.

Development

Origins and concept
The Disney studio made their first attempts to adapt Hans Christian Andersen's fairytale, The Snow Queen, as early as 1943, when Walt Disney considered the possibilities to produce a biography film of the author. However, the story and the characters proved to be too symbolic and implicit that they posed unsolvable problems to Disney and his animators. Later on, other Disney executives had made efforts to translate this material to the big screen; however, these proposals were all shelved due to similar issues.

He's depicted to have bright auburn/red hair much like Anna. He has green eyes, pales skin, rose cheeks and freckles. For most of the film he was wearing a white, blue and purple suit.

Voice
He is voiced in Frozen and Frozen Fever by Santino Fontana. On playing the role, Fontana stated "It's pretty great... When I wanted to be an actor, I always think of like trying to get to the place of the floor is lava, that feeling of like you're a little kid... If I can get to that place of finding like here's what I'm playing like a kid... And the great thing about animation is you're not limited by anything physical or even logical."

Other voices
Since 2015, some local TV stations have been dubbing the movie in their local languages (namely: Albanian, Arabic TV, Karachay-Balkar, Persian and Tagalog). This means that the voice actor varies from country to country.

Design and characterization

Usually the hero or heroine of the film undergoes a transformation (e.g. Aladdin goes from street rat to prince, Cinderella from servant to princess). In Frozen, Hans goes from a courtly charmer to power-hungry villain. According to Hyrum Osmond, one of the supervising animators for Hans, Hans initially appears as a handsome, dashing character. The crew wanted the audience to fall in love with him and the relationship he could have with Anna. Then they got to turn him around towards the climax and make it a big shock. According to Lino Di Salvo, Hans is a chameleon who adapts to any environment to make the other characters comfortable. And one of the biggest challenges in designing Hans, according to Bill Schwab, character design supervisor, was to make sure that they covered all aspects of his personality without fully tipping their hand to the audience. He shares similar personalities with various Disney villains: notably, the personality of Lady Tremaine for the way he treats Anna near the climax of the end. He shares with Ratigan from The Great Mouse Detective, Frollo from The Hunchback of Notre Dame, Scar from The Lion King, and Jafar from Aladdin, intentions for wanting to murder their respective rulers and install themselves as king (which only Ratigan, Frollo and Hans are almost able to fulfill, while Jafar decided he would force Jasmine to marry him and not kill her. On the other hand, Scar had succeeded in killing Mufasa and taking over as king until he was finally foiled by Simba, who forced his confession during their fight). He shares similarities with Gaston from Beauty and the Beast in which they were the youngest villains to appear and having the towns fall in love with them. However, the main difference is that Belle quickly saw Gaston for who he is and distrusted him, whereas Hans gained Anna's trust before betraying her. Afterwards, he left a lasting and negative impact on Anna when she realizes that the warning Elsa, and later Kristoff, originally gave her about falling in love with someone she just met
was true, convincing Anna to realise this was a mistake.

Hyrum Osmond, one of the film's supervising animators, later revealed that during the "Love Is an Open Door" musical sequence, a brief moment where Hans, belting out a high note under a waterfall, closes his eyes and raises his arm, was a parody of a signature move by Donny Osmond, of whom Hyrum is a nephew.

Appearances

Frozen

Once the Southern Isles is given word of Queen Elsa's coronation, Hans is the royal representative that attends in honor of his country. Along with the other invited royalty, he arrives on the day of the event and is first seen arriving in Arendelle on his horse, Sitron, who accidentally runs into Princess Anna when she crashes into his horse, and falls into a rowboat. Using grace and charm, Hans immediately woos the lovesick princess, with Anna almost immediately falling for him due to his wondrous looks and undeniable charisma. Moments later, Hans attends Queen Elsa's crowning, waving to Anna as he watches alongside the other visiting royals and dignitaries. Later on that night, a ball is held in honor of the new queen and Hans appears at the celebration party, soon finding and inviting Anna for a romantic waltz after coincidentally bumping into her once again.

During their time together, Hans learns of Anna's longing of having someone special in her life, with her sister apparently developing a dislike of being around her by suddenly shutting Anna out one day when they were kids, to which Hans openly relates to, only furthering Anna's connection with him. And with this, Hans promises to never shut Anna out, unlike Elsa, much to the princess' absolute joy. By the end of their tour, Hans works up the courage to propose, with Anna agreeing in a heartbeat. The two head back to the royal throne room, where the party is being held, to ask for Elsa's blessing. Elsa coldly refuses, denying Anna marrying someone she just met, and subsequently ends the party. Suspecting he has an ulterior motive for wanting to marry Anna, she orders Hans to leave out of frustration. Heartbroken, Anna confronts her sister, but this accidentally exposes Elsa's abilities to conjure up ice and snow, much to Hans' shock, along with everyone else's. The Duke of Weselton immediately declares Elsa a monster, and orders his men to capture her. Elsa flees, accidentally causing an eternal winter over Arendelle while doing so, with Anna and Hans chasing after her until she runs across the surface of the fjord. Anna volunteers to go after Elsa, but Hans objects to her going by herself, considering it too dangerous. However, Anna insists that Hans stay behind to take care of Arendelle during her absence, to which the prince eventually agrees.

It does not take long for Arendelle to turn into an icy wasteland. However, through it all, Hans proved to be a worthy ruler, winning the hearts of Arendelle's citizens, gaining their trust and loyalty through his seemingly benevolent and caring ways. Hans does so by distributing free cloaks to the public and setting up soup lines in the palace. The Duke of Weselton is furious that Hans is giving away Arendelle's tradeable goods. Scolding Hans, the Duke then openly expresses his suspicion over Anna and Elsa, believing they're conspiring together to doom them all. Hans immediately snaps and threatens to punish the Duke for treason if he doesn't silence himself. Just then, Anna's horse returns, riderless, making Hans believe Anna is in danger. With the royal guards and the Duke's men, Hans leads a rescue mission for Anna and a hunt for Elsa.

A few days later, the army arrives at Elsa's ice palace. As they are approaching the front steps, Elsa's snowlem bouncer, Marshmallow, disguised as a pile of snow by the staircase, suddenly attacks him. While Hans and his army battle Marshmallow, the Duke's two guards make their way inside to take on Elsa. Hans manages to defeat Marshmallow by slicing his leg off, sending him plunging into a gorge. With him out of the way, Hans and the others rush inside to find Anna, but she is nowhere in sight. Instead, they find Elsa merely seconds away from killing the Duke's two guards. Hans is able to stop her, freeing the two thugs. However, one of the thugs attempts to shoot her with his bolt, but Hans interferes and causes the bolt to shoot upward and shatter the hook on a massive chandelier, which crashes down and manages to knock Elsa unconscious. Captured, Elsa is imprisoned in Arendelle's dungeon. Hans decides to pay Elsa a visit, asking her to put an end to the winter. However, Elsa confesses she has no idea how and asks to be released. Hans claims he will do what he can.

Anna suddenly returns and desperately begs Hans for a kiss. The two are given privacy and Anna explains that during her journey, Elsa froze her heart, and only an act of true love can save her from freezing to death. However, Hans smirks, revealing his true colors and rejects Anna. Confused, Anna tries to understand what's going on, but Hans simply explains his entire plot to marry her, arrange an "accident" for Elsa, and become king of Arendelle through marriage. Anna tries to stop him, but she is far too weak. After informing her his next move is to kill Elsa and bring back summer, Hans leaves Anna to die, locking the door and trapping her within to prevent others from finding her or prevent her from escaping and interfering. Hans then returns to the Duke and the other dignitaries. He tells them Anna was killed by Elsa, but is unaware that Olaf foiled him by helping Anna escape. He sentences Elsa to death for high treason.

Meanwhile, through her magic, Elsa manages to escape her cell by freezing her shackles until they become so brittle that they break, then freezing the wall of her cell until it collapses. Hans chases after her into the frozen fjords as a harsh blizzard consumes the kingdom. He eventually stumbles upon her, and claims to her she cannot escape all the horrible things she has already done. Elsa pleads for mercy, and asks him to take care of her sister for her, to which Hans responds by telling her that Anna has died from Elsa freezing her heart (or so Hans thinks, since Olaf has found Anna and helped her escape). Elsa collapses, and whilst she is distracted, Hans pulls out his sword and prepares to stab her. As he is swinging, Anna suddenly arrives and jumps in front of Hans' sword path, completely freezing solid just before Hans' blade strikes her and shatters. Anna's freezing causes a forceful blast, knocking Hans off his feet and rendering him unconscious.

When he awakens several moments later, he finds Arendelle thawed and peace restored. Enraged by what Hans did to Anna and what he was doing to Elsa, Kristoff approaches Hans intending to attack him, but Anna intervenes. Instead, Anna confronts Hans, and the sight of her alive and well confuses Hans, prompting him to ask how she survived the frozen heart curse. She tells him that the only person who has a frozen heart is Hans himself for what he did to her and Elsa. Anna turns her back to him, much to Hans' disbelief, then, in a swift movement, turns around again and punches him in the face and off the side of a ship. Humiliated and defeated, Hans is last seen imprisoned on a ship heading back to the Southern Isles. According to the French dignitary, Hans is set to receive an ultimate (and unspecified) punishment from his older brothers.

Frozen Fever
Hans briefly makes an appearance in Frozen Fever where he is seen cleaning up horse manure in the Southern Isles as part of his punishment from his family in his actions against Queen Elsa and Arendelle. After Elsa sneezes into her birthday bugle horn, she creates a large snowball that flies over to the Southern Isles and accidentally catapults Hans into a pile of manure, causing all the horses in the stable to laugh at his misfortune.

Frozen II
Hans is frequently mentioned in Frozen II, and he appears in the snowy flashback manifestations of Elsa's past, where Elsa destroys his figure due to her being bitter at him for his past actions.

Kingdom Hearts III
Hans appears in two short scenes recreating moments from the film, and has no lines. He first appears dragging an unconscious Elsa back to the kingdom for execution, where Sora notes an extreme amount of darkness within him and expresses willingness to kill him if it means saving Elsa and protecting Arendelle from further harm. Hans appears later on trying to kill Elsa, which Anna stops by coming between them and freezing, knocking Hans to the ground as in the film. The scene then diverges from canon, with Hans being consumed by his own darkness and giving birth to a wolf-shaped Heartless called Skoll which serves as the world's main boss. Hans dies when Skoll is defeated, leaving him eternally banished to the Realm of Darkness, a fate shared with Mother Gothel and the Tremaine family.

Reception
While the film has largely received critical acclaim, critics were divided on the reveal of Hans' duplicity. Gina Dalfonzo from The Atlantic questioned the reveal's age-appropriateness, saying, "Children will, in their lifetimes, necessarily learn that not everyone who looks or seems trustworthy is trustworthy—but Frozen'''s big twist is a needlessly upsetting way to teach that lesson." Other critics disagreed: Melissa Leon from The Daily Beast said, "Anna is being ridiculous. But unlike Snow White or Sleeping Beauty, the world of Frozen knows that. It uses Anna's ill-thought-out engagement to show exactly why the cliché is unrealistic and absurd—in her case, it even proves dangerous as ... her charming prince turns out to be a two-faced villain." Alyssa Rosenberg of ThinkProgress took a moderate position, arguing, "Rather than declaring Prince Charming fantasies good or bad, I think Frozen is part of a tradition of adding heft to Prince Charming himself. And that's a good thing. [...] Frozen'' might have been a dud if Hans had only been a jerk. But, so help me, I found myself with some sympathy for the guy."

References

Demon characters in video games
Disney animated villains
Disney's Frozen characters
Film characters introduced in 2013
Fictional Scandinavian people
Male characters in animated films
Male film villains
Video game antagonists
Fictional princes
Animated characters introduced in 2013